Karl Wendlinger (born 20 December 1968) is an Austrian professional racing and former Formula One driver.

Mercedes Juniors
Born in Kufstein, Wendlinger started his career in karting and in Formula Ford before entering the German Formula 3 Championship in 1988. After managing tenth place in that inaugural season, Wendlinger won the crown in 1989, which earned him also a drive in the Mercedes-Benz sportscar team for 1990.

Driving the Sauber-Mercedes C11 – alongside Michael Schumacher, Heinz-Harald Frentzen, Mauro Baldi and Jean-Louis Schlesser – the quintet managed to achieve fifth place in the 1990 World Sportscar Championship standings.

In 1991, he continued to race with Mercedes sportscars — alongside a Formula 3000 programme with the Helmut Marko team. Towards the end of the year, Mercedes's team boss Jochen Neerpasch placed two of his protégés in Formula One. Schumacher went to the Jordan team before signing for Benetton, whilst Wendlinger made a low key Formula One debut with the Leyton House outfit for the final two Grands Prix of the season.

Formula One

1991–1992: Leyton House/March
Wendlinger's Formula One debut came at the 1991 Japanese Grand Prix at Suzuka, bringing some money to the beleaguered Leyton House team in place of long-serving Ivan Capelli. He qualified in 22nd place in a field of 26, but was unable to convert that into anything more, after he retired due to a big collision at turn one, between himself, JJ Lehto, Andrea de Cesaris and Emanuele Pirro. His second race didn't fare much better as the Adelaide circuit was a wash-out, torrential rain leading to a curtailed event. Wendlinger was classified in 20th place, two laps down on eventual winner Ayrton Senna, after aquaplaning on some of the huge puddles of water present that day.

Wendlinger was kept at the renamed March team in 1992, alongside Paul Belmondo. The team were struggling financially due to the withdrawal of the Leyton House organisation, the only modifications to the 1991 car being reworking the cockpit to accommodate Wendlinger's tall frame. The results were very encouraging, including starting 7th at the opening South African Grand Prix but results were limited by the team's financial restraints. For example, at the Spanish Grand Prix the drying track at the start saw the Footwork team make a late change of tyres to their cars on the starting grid, incurring a fine but finishing 5th and 7th. Wendlinger was 8th, March being unable to afford the fine for changing his tyres at the same time. However, at the Canadian Grand Prix in Montreal a race of attrition allowed Wendlinger to bring the car home in fourth position, albeit a lap down — but nonetheless a huge result considering the financial troubles his team were in. These three points allowed Wendlinger to finish 12th in the Drivers' Championship ahead of respected names such as Ivan Capelli, Thierry Boutsen, Johnny Herbert and former Brabham and Tyrrell driver Stefano Modena.

1993–1995: Sauber
For 1993, Wendlinger was re-united with Peter Sauber, who that year had become a Formula One team owner. Much was expected of the team and early on Wendlinger and teammate JJ Lehto mixed with the front runners. Initially he was out-paced by the Finn, who scored points in two of the first four races though some of this was down to bad luck; Wendlinger had qualified 5th at Donington for example, only to be eliminated by Michael Andretti on the first lap. At the Monaco Grand Prix Wendlinger and Lehto collided, the team blaming the Finn. After that, Wendlinger's results improved. He scored his first point of the season in the next round and added three more points scores — the best being 4th at the Italian Grand Prix after a long battle with Andretti. Other points finishes in Portugal and Hungary helped give Wendlinger 12th in the Drivers' Championship again with seven points — two points and a place ahead of the more experienced Lehto.

For 1994, Wendlinger was retained as Mercedes made their official return to Formula One, buying a stake in Ilmor and becoming the team's engine supplier. Heinz-Harald Frentzen arrived in place of Lehto. The season started well for Wendlinger: He scored a point in the first race of the year at Interlagos and drove to fourth place in the San Marino race, an event marred by the deaths of both Wendlinger's countryman Roland Ratzenberger and the 3-times world champion Ayrton Senna.

The next race was in Monaco for the fourth round of the Championship. During the first practice session, Wendlinger exited the tunnel and lost control of the car under braking for the Nouvelle Chicane. The Sauber, sliding sideways, hit a barrier with considerable force; the barrier was protected by large plastic containers that were supposed to be filled with water, but weren't. Wendlinger's head struck the metal crash barrier, and FIA doctors found him unconscious. This crash had measured 360g, the highest crash survived by a human in history. Although his vital signs were quickly stabilized, he remained in a coma for several weeks and did not drive in a race for the rest of the year. He had planned to make his comeback at the Japanese Grand Prix, but pre-race testing revealed his neck was not strong enough.

Wendlinger recovered from his injuries before the start of the 1995 Formula One season, where he would be driving at Sauber (now with Ford engines) alongside Frentzen. However, he performed poorly and was reluctantly replaced in the team before the Monaco Grand Prix, a year on from the accident, by Jean-Christophe Boullion. Peter Sauber then recalled Wendlinger for the final two races of the season in one last attempt to regain his pre-accident form, without success. These were his last races in Formula One.

After Formula One
Since then, he has competed successfully in sports cars and touring cars, winning the FIA GT Championship (with Olivier Beretta) in 1999. After a spell racing for Abt-Audi in DTM in 2002 and 2003 he raced for JMB Racing in FIA GT again, driving a Maserati MC12 with Andrea Bertolini.

Since 2006, Wendlinger has been part of the JetAlliance Racing team, competing again in the FIA GT Championship. His teammate in 2006 was Phillip Peter, and in 2007 his teammate was Scottish driver, Ryan Sharp.

2007 Wendlinger competed at the 24 Hours of Daytona with Sigal Sport team in a BMW powered Riley DP. He crashed during the night on his in lap at the end of his second stint and was sent to the hospital as a precaution. The car eventually was retired from the damage.

2008
Wendlinger has been competing for JetAlliance Racing in 2008 alongside Ryan Sharp. They started well at the RAC Tourist Trophy round from Silverstone. Wendlinger and Sharp won the GT1 class and overall race ahead of Michael Bartels and Andrea Bertolini's Maserati MC12.

Racing record

Career summary

Complete International Formula 3000 results
(key) (Races in bold indicate pole position; races in italics indicate fastest lap.)

Complete Formula One results
(key)

24 Hours of Le Mans results

Complete Deutsche Tourenwagen Meisterschaft/Masters results
(key) (Races in bold indicate pole position) (Races in italics indicate fastest lap)

† — Retired, but was classified as he completed 90% of the winner's race distance.

Complete FIA GT Championship results
(key) (Races in bold indicate pole position) (Races in italics indicate fastest lap)

Complete GT1 World Championship results

Helmet
Wendlinger's helmet is yellow with 2 blue parallel lines in the middle of the helmet, a blue circle on the top and 3 red white red arrows between the parallel lines.

References

External links
Official site [in German]
Profile at DriverDB.com

Austrian racing drivers
Austrian Formula One drivers
Leyton House Formula One drivers
March Formula One drivers
Sauber Formula One drivers
German Formula Three Championship drivers
24 Hours of Le Mans drivers
FIA GT Championship drivers
Deutsche Tourenwagen Masters drivers
1968 births
Living people
International Formula 3000 drivers
People from Kufstein
24 Hours of Daytona drivers
American Le Mans Series drivers
European Le Mans Series drivers
Austrian Formula Three Championship drivers
FIA GT1 World Championship drivers
World Sportscar Championship drivers
Blancpain Endurance Series drivers
ADAC GT Masters drivers
24 Hours of Spa drivers
Sportspeople from Tyrol (state)
Peugeot Sport drivers
Aston Martin Racing drivers
Fortec Motorsport drivers
Oreca drivers
Mercedes-AMG Motorsport drivers
Audi Sport drivers
Porsche Motorsports drivers
Abt Sportsline drivers
RSM Marko drivers
David Price Racing drivers
Nürburgring 24 Hours drivers
24H Series drivers